The Best of Candlemass: As It Is, as It Was is a compilation album by the Swedish doom metal band Candlemass. It consists of tracks from the first five studio albums, a live album and a couple of EPs. This compilation was released after their "unofficial" break up.

Track listings
All songs by Leif Edling, except "The End of Pain"" by Edling/Lars Johansson
Disc one
"Solitude" - 5:36
"Bewitched" - 6:39
"Dying Illusion" - 5:49
"Demons Gate" - 9:11
"Mirror Mirror" (live) - 5:30  
"Samarithan" - 5:29
"Into the Unfanthomed Tower" - 3:04
"Bearer of Pain" - 7:24
"Where the Runes Still Speak" - 8:39
"At the Gallows End" - 5:46
"Mourner's Lament" - 6:08

Disc two
"A Tale of Creation" - 6:54
"Ebony Throne" - 4:23
"Under the Oak" - 6:00
"Well of Souls" (live) - 5:23  
"Dark Are the Veils of Death" - 4:04
"Darkness in Paradise" - 6:48
"The End of Pain" - 4:23
"Sorcerer's Pledge" - 10:13
"Solitude" (12" version) - 5:47  
"Crystal Ball" (12" Version) - 5:27  
"Bullfest" (93 Swedish Party Single) - 3:14

References

Candlemass (band) albums
1994 compilation albums
Music for Nations compilation albums